Live and Become is a 2005 French drama film about an Ethiopian Christian boy who disguises himself as an Ethiopian Jew to escape famine and emigrates to Israel. It was directed by Romanian-born Radu Mihăileanu. It won awards at the Berlin and Vancouver film festivals among others.

Plot 
Schlomo, an Ethiopian boy, is placed by his Christian mother with an Ethiopian Jewish woman whose child has died. This woman, who will become his adoptive mother, is about to be airlifted from a Sudanese refugee camp to Israel during Operation Moses in 1984. His birth mother, who hopes for a better life for him, tells him "Go, live, and become," as he leaves her to get on the bus. The film tells of his growing up in Israel and how he deals with the secrets he carries: not being Jewish and having left his birth mother.

Cast 
Moshe Agazai as Child Schlomo 
Moshe Abebe as Teenage Schlomo
Sirak M. Sabahat as Adult Schlomo
Yael Abecassis as Yael Harrari
Roschdy Zem as Yoram Harrari
Roni Hadar as Sarah
Rami Danon as Papy 
Raymonde Abecassis as Suzy 
Mimi Abonesh Kebede as Hana
Meskie Shibru-Sivan Hadar as Schlomo's mother
Yitzhak Edgar as Qes Amhra
Aaron Vodovoz as Kibbutz Boy

Accolades

International

In the United States
Audience Awards unless otherwise noted
 Boston Jewish Film Festival
 Washington Jewish Film Festival
 Miami Jewish Film Festival
 Atlanta Jewish Film Festival
 Detroit Jewish Film Festival (Best Film)
 San Diego Jewish Film Festival
 Orange County Jewish Film Festival
 Palm Desert Jewish Film Festival
 Palm Beach Jewish Film Festival
 Tampa Jewish Film Festival
 Seattle Jewish Film Festival
 Cleveland International Film Festival
 Nashville Film Festival
 Los Angeles Jewish Film Festival
 Detroit Jewish Film Festival (Audience Award)
 Washington DC International Film Festival (Runner-Up)
 Aspen Filmfest

References

External links
 Live and Become on IA (French)
Official Site

 
2006 SFJFF Interview with Sirak M. Sabahat

2005 films
Amharic-language films
2000s French-language films
2000s Hebrew-language films
French drama films
Israeli drama films
2005 drama films
Films about adoption
Films about immigration
Films about Jews and Judaism
Films directed by Radu Mihăileanu
Beta Israel
Films set in Israel
Films set in Sudan
2005 multilingual films
French multilingual films
Israeli multilingual films
2000s French films